Lobjoit is a surname. Notable people with the surname include:

Billy Lobjoit (born 1993), English footballer
Leon Lobjoit (born 1995), English footballer